Alexandra Claire McMurtry (born December 8, 1996) is an American former artistic gymnast. She is the 2013 Nastia Liukin Cup champion and the 2017 NCAA Champion.  She competed in NCAA gymnastics for the Florida Gators and was the 10th person in NCAA history to record a Gym Slam.

Early life and education 
McMurtry was born in Commerce Township, Michigan, to David and Christine McMurtry and has two siblings.  She graduated from James River High School in 2015 and started up at the University of Florida that fall and was part of their gymnastics team.  McMurtry graduated summa cum laude in August 2018 with degree in Applied Physiology & Kinesiology–Exercise Physiology.

Gymnastics career

Junior Olympic Level 10

2011 – 2012
McMurtry competed at the 2011 Women's Junior Olympic Level 10 National Championships in Long Beach, California.  She won the all-around title with 38.575 points, ahead of silver medalist Maggie Nichols.  She also tied for the highest score on vault with a 9.950 and floor with a score of 9.650.

In 2012 McMurtry competed at the Atlanta Crown Invitational where she placed first in the all-around and qualifier for the Nastia Liukin Cup.  There she placed second behind Charity Jones.  At the 2012 Women's Junior Olympic Level 10 National Championships, McMurtry once again placed first.

2013 – 2014 
In early 2013, McMurtry verbally committed to attend the University of Florida on a gymnastics scholarship.  In March 2013 McMurtry once again competed at the Nastia Liukin Cup; this time she finished in first place.  At the 2013 Women's Junior Olympic Level 10 National Championships she finished in second place behind future Florida Gator teammate Alicia Boren.  At the 2014 Women's Junior Olympic Level 10 National Championships, McMurtry finished in eighth place after a disappointing uneven bars performance.  She finished first on vault.

NCAA

2014–2015 
As a freshman in 2015, McMurtry regularly contributed to the Florida gymnastics team on vault, bars and beam during the regular season, and also saw action on floor. She was ranked #1 in the nation on vault at the end of the regular season on March 16, 2015.

2015–2016 
McMurtry made her floor exercise debut in a match against LSU.  She received two perfect 10s on uneven bars.

2016–2017 
McMurtry won the all-around at both the Southeastern Conference Championships and at the 2017 NCAA Women's Gymnastics Championship. Additionally she won the Honda Sports Award and the NCAA Elite 90 Award, an award given to the student-athlete with the highest GPA at each of the 90 NCAA championships sites.

2017–2018 
On January 26, McMurtry earned a perfect 10 on balance beam, thus completing a Gym Slam – earning a perfect 10 on each apparatus.  She is the second Florida Gator to achieve this feat after Bridget Sloan.  Later in the season McMurtry won the gold on vault at both the Southeastern Conference Championships and at the 2018 NCAA Women's Gymnastics Championship.  She was also awarded the NCAA's Today's Top 10 Award.

Career perfect 10.0

Competitive history

References 

1996 births
Living people
Level 10 gymnasts
People from Brighton, Michigan
People from Midlothian, Virginia
Sportspeople from Metro Detroit
Sportspeople from Virginia
American female artistic gymnasts
Florida Gators women's gymnasts
NCAA gymnasts who have scored a perfect 10
21st-century American women